Satyashraya, also known as Sattiga or Irivabedanga, was a king of the Western Chalukya Empire. During a time of consolidation of the empire in the early 11th century, Satyashraya was involved in several battles with the Chola dynasty of Thanjavur, the Paramara dynasty and Chedi Kingdom of central India, and the Chaulukyas of Gujarat. The results of these wars were mixed, with victories and defeats. Even as a prince, during the rule of his father Tailapa II, Satyashraya had established himself as an ambitious warrior. Satyashraya patronised the great Kannada poet Ranna (one among the "three gems" or ratnatraya of classical Kannada literature) who compared his patron favourably to the Pandava prince Bhima (of the epic Mahabharatha) for his strength and valor in his epic poem Sahasabhimavijaya (lit, "Daring Bhima", the epic also known as Gadayuddha). Satyashraya held such titles as Akalavarsha, Akalankacharita and Sahasabhima.

Battles in the North
During the reign of Satyashraya, the Paramaras and Chedi rulers of central India (also known as the Kalachuris of Tripuri) appear to have regained control over territories they had lost to the Satyashraya's father Tailapa II (on account of his victories over Munja in c. 996). Satyashraya however subdued the Shilahara King Aparajita of the northern Konkan and made him a vassal. There was rebellion against the Lata Chalukya chief Barapa in the Gujarat province of the Western Chalukya empire. Barapa had been ousted by Mularaja from the Chaulukya family. Satyashraya led an expedition to Gujarat, defeated Mularaja and reinstated Goggiraja, son of Barapa. Thus, he  consolidated his control over that region.

Wars with the Cholas
During the early 11th century, the Chola dynasty of Thanjavur were on the ascendant. The Chola influence in the eastern Deccan ruled by the Chalukyas of Vengi (the Eastern Chalukyas) was on the rise. With the help of the Cholas, Saktivarman had defeated Jata-Choda Bhima and gained control of the Vengi kingdom. The rise of Chola influence in the east was unacceptable to the Western Chalukyas. Satyasaraya wasted no time in sending his armies under the command of Bayalanambi around c.1006. Satyashraya's armies conquered the forts at Dhanyakataka (or Dharanikota) and Yanamandala. With these victories, Satyashraya was able to  establish himself temporarily at Chebrolu in the modern Guntur district.

However, these early victories were temporary. The Chola King Rajaraja I mounted a two pronged counter-attack. A large Chola army led by prince Rajendra Chola invaded and captured Donur in the Bijapur region, Banavasi, parts of the Raichur Doab (called Iditurainnadu), Manyakheta (or Malkheda, called Mannaikkadakkam) in the modern Kalaburagi district, Unkal near modern Hubli, and Kudalasangama in modern Bagalkot district. According to the historians Chopra et al., one inscription of c.1007 describes his attack on Rattapadi. They opine that such a simultaneous invasion on Banavasi (also spelt Vanavasi) and Manyakheta, two vastly separated regions could not have been possible without a large army and a well planned military operation. A second thrust came from the east, from Vengi, where the Cholas successfully reduced forts at Kollipakkai (Kulpak) 45  miles north-east of modern Hyderabad. According to the historians Sastri and Sen, Satyashraya thereafter invested a great deal of effort in successfully freeing his kingdom from the Chola hold. According to historian Kamath, that Satyashraya was able to free his kingdom from the Cholas entirely, though at the cost of the life of his brother prince Dasavarman, is testified to by the Hottur inscription.

Notes

References

 

10th-century births
Year of birth unknown
10th-century Indian monarchs
11th-century Indian monarchs
Western Chalukya Empire
Year of death unknown